Matías Córdoba may refer to:

 Matías Córdoba (footballer, born 1984), Argentine midfielder
 Matías Córdoba (footballer, born 1999), Argentine midfielder or forward